Nate Houser is a retired American soccer player who coaches the Baker University men's and women's soccer teams.  He played professionally in the A-League, National Professional Soccer League and second Major Indoor Soccer League.

Player
In 1990, Houser graduated from Poway High School.  He attended Baker University, playing on the men's soccer team from 1990 to 1993.  He graduated with a bachelor's degree in history and political science.  In 2007, Baker University inducted Houser into its Athletic Hall of Fame.  In 1993, the Wichita Wings drafted Houser in the territorial round of the National Professional Soccer League draft, but traded him to the Kansas City Attack.  He went on to play eleven seasons with the Attack.  In 1997, Kansas City won the NPSL championship.  In addition to playing the winter indoor season with Kansas City, Houser also played outdoors with the Hampton Roads Mariners during the 1996 A-League season and the Rochester Rhinos during the 1997 A-League season.  On March 7, 2000, Houser signed with the Milwaukee Rampage.  On November 1, 2004, Houser joined the St. Louis Steamers.  On March 19, 2005, the Steamers traded Houser and Mike Apple to the Baltimore Blast for Carlos Farias.  In October 2010, he signed a one-year contract with the Missouri Comets.

Coach
In 2003, Baker University hired Houser to coach its women's soccer team.  In 2008, he also became the head coach of the men's soccer team.
In 2010, he led the women to their first NAIA National Tournament appearance. They made it all the way to the Fab Four. In 2011 the women returned to the national tournament making it to the quarterfinals. 
In 2008 the boys made their first NAIA sweet 16 appearance and in 2011 the boys made it to the Fab-Four.

References

Living people
1972 births
American Professional Soccer League players
American soccer coaches
American soccer players
Baltimore Blast (2001–2008 MISL) players
Virginia Beach Mariners players
Kansas City Attack players
Kansas City Comets (2001–2005 MISL) players
Major Indoor Soccer League (2001–2008) players
Milwaukee Rampage players
National Professional Soccer League (1984–2001) players
Rochester New York FC players
St. Louis Steamers (1998–2006) players
People from Poway, California
Sportspeople from California
Baker Wildcats men's soccer players
Association football forwards
Association football midfielders
Baker Wildcats men's soccer coaches
Baker Wildcats women's soccer coaches
Sportspeople from San Diego County, California